The Scientific Workgroup for Rocketry and Spaceflight (WARR) is a scientific workgroup situated at Technical University of Munich, composed mainly of its students. It was founded by students in 1962 with the goal to compensate for the lack of a chair for space technology at the university at the time. Since the establishment of such a chair in 1966, the group has conducted practical projects, starting with the first successful development and of a hybrid rocket in Germany. One rocket of this type was launched in 1972, another is on permanent display at Deutsches Museum. WARR has attained some public attention by for its projects in space elevator competitions, small satellites interstellar spaceflight concepts, and for  winning all SpaceX Hyperloop pod competitions.

Currently, WARR works in the fields of hybrid propulsion, satellite technology, robotics, and transportation technologies.

History

Project groups of WARR

Rocketry 

Existing since the foundation of WARR in 1962, the department for rocketry is the oldest project group of WARR. With the launch of the first German hybrid rocket in 1974, WARR achieved its first major success, which was promptly followed by the construction of multiple test engines. In 2009 the development of its next rocket began, called WARR-Ex2, powered by the in-house developed hybrid engine HYPER-1 with solid HTPB fuel and nitrous oxide as oxidizer. The rocket was successfully launched on 20 May 2015 from the missile base CLBI on the Atlantic coast of Brazil and reached a maximal altitude of approximately 5 km.
Even before the launch of WARR-Ex2, WARR had begun working on its successor, WARR-Ex3, as part of project STERN (STudentische Experimental-RaketeN)  (German abbreviation for "student experimental rocketry"), organized and financed by the German Aerospace Center. As the given objectives of STERN were already reached within WARR-Ex2, it was decided to build a larger rocket, which should break the European altitude record for student rockets, counting 21.5 km for now. To reach this goal, the WARR-Ex 3 uses liquid oxygen instead of nitrous oxide, while maintaining the use of HTPB.

Satellite Technology 

Since the cubesat First-MOVE was primarily developed by doctoral candidates from the institute of astronautics at the TUM, the involvement of students was intensified during the development of its successor MOVE-II. To make use of WARR's existing infrastructure, a new project group was founded, where the members could work on all subsystems. In 2012, development of a mission profile was started. After approval by the German Aerospace Center in 2015, launch of the satellite is expected in 2017.

MOVE-II is a 10x10x10 cm big satellite (1U-Cubesat). It consists of a bus on the one side, which is responsible for power supply, communication and attitude control. Its Mission is to educate Students and Test some prototype Solar Cells.
MOVE-IIb is an almost exact copy of MOVE-II launched in 2019.

Space-Elevator

WARR Space-Elevator is developing climber robots since its founding in 2005, and also organizes corresponding competitions. The first climber was developed for the JSETEC2009 competition and reached the targeted 150 m in the shortest time. In 2011 the European Space Elevator Challenge (EUSPEC) was established, which also focused on energy efficiency. Following that year the competition was repeated with increased cable length of 50 m.

Interstellar Flight

The WARR Interstellar Flight Team (ISF) is working on concepts for interstellar travel.
The goals of WARR ISF are:

 Research on manned and unmanned interstellar travel
 Utilization of methods from engineering sciences, especially interdisciplinary system engineering
 Publication of results on international conferences and journals
 Presentation of research findings to the public

In May 2013 the "Ghost Team" of WARR ISF participated in Project Icarus. The name "Ghost" derives from the sudden appearance of the team in the competition and resulting in confusion of the other participants. WARR presented its concept at the British Interplanetary Society in October 2013 and was awarded for the best design among 4 international teams.

In October 2014 begun development of a laser propelled interstellar probe for the Project Dragonfly Design Competition, held by the Initiative for Interstellar Studies (I4IS). The WARR team could prevail in this competition against international competitors, too.

Hyperloop

In August 2015 the project group Hyperloop was founded to participate in the Hyperloop Pod Competition sponsored by SpaceX. In January 2016, WARR's was one of 30 international teams selected (from a pool of over 700 initially participating) to build a functional prototype for the final phase of the competition in summer of 2016.

, the prototype developed by WARR was intended to feature an electrodynamic suspension system to levitate and an axial compressor to minimize aerodynamic drag from the residual air inside the tube.

The WARR pod was the fastest in the January 2017 competition which was run on the SpaceX Hyperloop test track—or Hypertube—a mile-long, partial-vacuum, -diameter steel tube purpose-built in Hawthorne, California for the competition.
In December 2018, WARR Hyperloop was rebranded to TUM Hyperloop. Since this time it is managed by a separate organisation, called NEXT.

See also 
 Delft Aerospace Rocket Engineering
 Space Concordia

External links 
 TUM Hyperloop
 Youtube-Channel of TUM Hyperloop
 WARR Homepage
 Youtube-Channel of WARR

References 

Rocketry
Space agencies
Space programme of Germany
Technical University of Munich